Plymouth Township may refer to:

 Plymouth Township, Plymouth County, Iowa
 Plymouth Township, Russell County, Kansas
 Plymouth Township, Michigan
 Plymouth Township, Washington County, North Carolina, in Washington County, North Carolina
 Plymouth Township, Grand Forks County, North Dakota, in Grand Forks County, North Dakota
 Plymouth Township, Ashtabula County, Ohio
 Plymouth Township, Richland County, Ohio
 Plymouth Township, Luzerne County, Pennsylvania
 Plymouth Township, Montgomery County, Pennsylvania

Township name disambiguation pages